Altay Spor Kulübü is a Turkish professional football club based in the city of İzmir. Formed in 1914, Altay are nicknamed Büyük Altay (Great Altay). The club colors are black and white, and they currently play their home matches at the Bornova Stadium, while a new stadium is under construction at the site of the Altay Alsancak Stadium, where they previously played.

Domestically, the club has finished third place for the Süper Lig three times and have won the Turkish Cup twice. They hold the record for most İzmir Football League titles with 14. They are the most successful İzmir-based club with 16 championships in various competitions.

Collecting 24 points in the first half of the 1969–70 season in undefeated 15 games with 9 wins and 6 draws, Altay SK is one of six non-champion clubs that topped the first half of 1. Lig table, along with Kocaelispor in 1992–93, and Sivasspor in 2007–08, 2008–09 and 2019–20.

History
Altay was founded in 1914 in İzmir as İstiklal. The initial aim of the club was to unite Turkish youth under sporting activities and to encourage them, because in the 1910s minorities dominated sporting activities in İzmir. Under Ottoman rule, Turkish footballers were unable to compete. Altay was supported by many prominent Turkish politicians of the era. Former Turkish President Celal Bayar worked very hard in founding the club and gave his full support.

Altay has an important place in Turkey's football history. The club had a key role in uniting the Turkish community during the Turkish War of Independence. Many players and supporters of Altay SK lost their lives in the Turkish War. After the Surname Law was adopted, Mustafa Kemal Atatürk gave General Fahreddin Pasha the surname of "Altay". Altay play in İzmir Alsancak Stadium first built in 1929 and recently renovated in 2021.

Honours

National Championships
 Süper Lig
 Third place (3): 1956–57, 1969–70, 1976–77
 Turkish Football Championship
 Runners-up (2): 1934, 1951
 TFF First League
 Winners (1): 2001–02
 Runners-up (2): 1983–84, 1990–91
 Turkish Football Federation Cup
 Winners (1): 2006–07
 Runners-up (1): 1963–64

National Cups
 Turkish Cup
 Winners (2): 1966–67, 1979–80
 Runners-up (5): 1963–64, 1967–68, 1971–72, 1978–79, 1985–86
 Super Cup
 Runners-up (2): 1967, 1980
 Prime Minister's Cup
 Runners-up (3): 1972, 1979, 1986
 Organ Doğan Cup
 Runners-up (18): 1936, 1937, 1945, 1946, 1947, 1948, 1949, 1950, 1958, 1961, 1968, 1973, 1974, 1975, 1984, 2004, 2005, 2021
 Ayçilek Doğan Cup
 Runners-up (2): 1973, 1978
 Tore Doğan Cup
 Runners-up (1): 1976
 Aydin Doğan Cup
 Runners-up (3): 1963, 1964, 1986

Regional competitions
 İzmir Professional League
 Winners (2): 1956–57, 1957–58
 İzmir Football League 
 Winners (14) (record): 1923–24, 1924–25, 1927–28, 1928–29, 1930–31, 1933–34, 1936–37, 1940–41, 1945–46, 1947–48, 1950–51, 1953–54, 1956–57, 1957–58
1Altay won the championship as "Üçok" (Three arrows), an alliance between Altay, Altınordu, and Bucaspor.

League Participations
 Super League: 1958–83, 1984–90, 1991–2000, 2002–03, 2021–
 TFF First League: 1983–84, 1990–91, 2000–02, 2003–11, 2018–21
 TFF Second League: 2011–15, 2017–18
 TFF Third League: 2015–17

European record

1 UEFA edition.

2 non-UEFA edition.

UEFA Cup Winners' Cup:

UEFA Cup/UEFA Europa League:

UEFA Intertoto Cup:

1 The tournament was founded in 1961–62, but was only taken over by UEFA in 1995.

Inter-Cities Fairs Cup:

Balkans Cup:

UEFA Ranking history:

Players

Current squad

Other players under contract

Out on loan

See also
List of Turkish sports clubs by foundation dates
Altay–Göztepe derby
 Altay S.K. (women's football)

References

External links
Official website
Altay on TFF.org

 
Association football clubs established in 1914
Football clubs in Turkey
1914 establishments in the Ottoman Empire
Süper Lig clubs